Society for the study of the native land is an association of ethnographers of Chuvashia to study the local region. The Company distributes scientific data on native land, introduces the population of the republic with the life and culture of the peoples of the country.

Structure and composition 
In the society functioned sections: natural-historical, historical, archaeological, ethnographic, socio-political, artistic and literature, scientific and educational, organizational and instructors, information, since 1925 – a constitutional section.

In the first year in the community was 51 members., In 1924 – 90, in 1926 – 155, including academicians, professors, researchers – 27 secondary school teachers – 24, agronomists – 16, doctors – 6, writers – 6 artists – 6 students – 27, and the rest – civil servants.

In the Company's assets consisted of Studies of the local history enthusiasts K.V. Elli, D.S. Elmen, N.I. Vanerkke, I.K. Lukyanov, D. Petrov, F. Pavlov.

History 
Society was created February 12, 1921 in Cheboksary in the Chuvash National Museum.

The company's charter was approved by the regional executive committee of the Chuvash April 16, 1921, the Board elected the following day.

Local historians were accounting and recording of archaeological monuments, the collection of archaeological objects for museums (A.V. Vasilyev, K.V. Elle et al.).

Occasionally they conducted exploration and excavation. AP Milli (Procopius) identify and examine the gravestones with Arabic inscriptions; KV Ella examined objects of antiquity, as well as spent excavations at the site finds Tihomirovskogo Juchi treasure coins (1928).

In Proceedings of the Society for the Study of local lore were printed books VF Smolin "Abashevo burial in the Chuvash Republic" (1928), reports PP Efimenko and articles on archeology Chuvashia. K.V. Ella and N.A. Archangel at the end of the 1920s. prepared a handwritten set of archaeological and ethnographic objects "Toponyms of Chuvashia. Antiquities Chuvash ASSR. "In 1930 P.N. Tretyakov continued work Srednevolzhskaya GAIMK expedition began studying monuments Fatyanovo (Balanovskaya) culture in Chuvashia (Atlikasinsky burial mound).

In the 1930s, active members of society were accused of bourgeois nationalism and repressed, after that the society ceased to exist.

Society was recreated in 1991.

Literature 
 Иванов, В. Краеведсем пухӑнса калаҫрӗҫ / В. Иванов // Хыпар. – 2000. – March, 31. 
 Казаков, Н. Чӑваш наци музейне тата таврапӗлӗҫисен пӗрлешӗвне – 75 ҫул / Н. Казаков // Канаш (Ульяновск обл.). – 1996. – July, 27. 
 Прокопьева, Р. Ват ҫын – тӑват ҫын, ҫавӑнпа та эп типмерӗм – тымар ятӑм / Р. Прокопьева // Хыпар. – 2000. – April, 4. 
 Савельев, Г. Краевед вӑл – патриот, агитатор, журналист / Г. Савельев // Ленин ҫулӗпе (Элӗк р–нӗ). – 1996. – May, 7. 
 Станьял, В. Таврапӗлӗҫисен ӑраскалӗ / В. Станьял // Ялав. – 1994. – № 10. – С. 22–24. 
 Живем судьбой и памятью народа. Отчетный доклад Председателя Союза чувашских краеведов, вице-президента Чувашской народной академии В. П. Станьяла на Годичном Собрании Союза чувашских краеведов и Чувашской национальной академии (24 ноября 2007 года, Чувашский национальный музей).
 Задачи первого этапа выполнены. Отчетный доклад председателя Союза чувашских краеведов В. П. Станьяла на IX съезде СЧК. (Чувашский национальный музей, 20 марта 2008 года)
 Савельев, Г. Съезд краеведов / Г. Савельев // Время. – 2000. – 8 апр. (N 15). 
 Сергеев, Т. С. Общество изучения местного края (ОИМК) / Т. С. Сергеев // Краткая чувашская энциклопедия. – Чебоксары, 2001. – С. 301. 
 Станьял, В. От общества изучения местного края до союза краеведов / В. Станьял // Канаш (Ульянов. обл.). – 1996. – 10 ҫурла ; Так же // Чувашский национальный музей : Люди. События. Факты : (1993–2000). – Чебоксары, 2001. – С. 12–13. 
 Требушкова, О. А. Общество изучения местного края и развитие массового краеведческого движения / О. А. Требушкова // Марийский археогр. вестн. – 1992. – № 2. – С. 41–47.

See also 
 Chuvash National Movement
 Chuvash National Congress
 Chuvash National Museum
 Chuvash national radio

References

External links 
 Society for the study of the native land
 Археологические памятники
 Society for the Study of the native land and development of a mass movement in the local history 1920–30.
 Society for the Study of the native land
 Станьял, В. П. Society for the Study of the native land

Culture of Chuvashia
Chuvash culture